Man from the Black Hills is a 1952 American Western film directed by Thomas Carr and starring Johnny Mack Brown, James Ellison and Rand Brooks.

The film's sets were designed by the art director Martin Obzina.

Plot

Cast
 Johnny Mack Brown as Johnny Mack Brown  
 James Ellison as Jim Fallon  
 Rand Brooks as Fake Jimmy Fallon  
 Lane Bradford as Sheriff Moran  
 I. Stanford Jolley as Pete Ingram 
 Stanley Andrews as Pop Fallon 
 Denver Pyle as Glenn Hartley  
 Ray Bennett as Hugh Delaney 
 Robert Bray as Ed Roper  
 Florence Lake as Martha  
 Stanley Price as Bill Shealey  
 Joel Allen as Deputy Bates

References

Bibliography
 Bernard A. Drew. Motion Picture Series and Sequels: A Reference Guide. Routledge, 2013.

External links
 

1952 films
1952 Western (genre) films
American Western (genre) films
Films directed by Thomas Carr
Monogram Pictures films
Films scored by Raoul Kraushaar
American black-and-white films
1950s English-language films
1950s American films